Reed Township is one of thirty-seven townships in Washington County, Arkansas, USA. As of the 2000 census, its total population was 410.

Reed Township was established in 1880.

Geography

The township was created from White River Township in 1880.

Cities, towns, villages
 Hazel Valley
 Porter's Store (historical)
 Sunset

Cemeteries
The township contains Temple Hill Cemetery and Terry Cemetery; along with Hazel Valley Cemetery, and Nickell Cemetery.

Major routes
The township contains no state highways.

References

 United States Census Bureau 2008 TIGER/Line Shapefiles
 United States National Atlas

External links
 US-Counties.com
 City-Data.com

Townships in Washington County, Arkansas
Populated places established in 1880
1880 establishments in Arkansas
Townships in Arkansas